Austfjordnes is a headland located in Austfjorden, the inner eastern branch of Wijdefjorden, in Ny-Friesland at Spitsbergen, Svalbard. A cabin available for trappers is located at Austfjordnes.

References

Headlands of Spitsbergen